Robin Söderling was the defending champion, but he lost to Nicolás Almagro in the final 5–7, 6–3, 2–6.

Seeds
The top four seeds receive a bye into the second round.

Draw

Finals

Top half

Bottom half

External Links
Main sraw
Qualifying draw

Swedish Open - Men's Singles
Swedish Open
Swedish